Roman à clef (anglicised as ), French for novel with a key, is a novel about real-life events that is overlaid with a façade of fiction. The fictitious names in the novel represent real people, and the "key" is the relationship between the non-fiction and the fiction. This metaphorical key may be produced separately—typically as an explicit guide to the text by the author—or implied, through the use of epigraphs or other literary techniques.

Madeleine de Scudéry created the roman à clef in the 17th century to provide a forum for her thinly veiled fiction featuring political and public figures.

The reasons an author might choose the roman à clef format include satire; writing about controversial topics and/or reporting inside information on scandals without giving rise to charges of libel; the opportunity to turn the tale the way the author would like it to have gone; the opportunity to portray personal, autobiographical experiences without having to expose the author as the subject; avoiding self-incrimination or incrimination of others that could be used as evidence in civil, criminal, or disciplinary proceedings; the ability to change the background and personalities of key participants; and the settling of scores.

Biographically inspired works have also appeared in other literary genres and art forms, notably the film à clef.

See also 

 Allegory
 Autobiografiction
 Autobiographical novel
 Autofiction
 Blind item
 Creative nonfiction
 Defamation
 List of narrative techniques
 Nomen à clef
 Non-fiction novel
 Semi-fiction
 Small penis rule

Notes

References 
 Amos, William (1985). The Originals: Who's Really Who in Fiction. London: Cape. .
 Busby, Brian (2003). Character Parts: Who's Really Who in CanLit. Toronto: Knopf Canada. .
 Rintoul, M.C. (2014). Dictionary of Real People and Places in Fiction

 
 
Literary genres